The sixth season of American animated comedy television series Regular Show, created by J. G. Quintel, originally aired on Cartoon Network in the United States. Quintel created the series' pilot using characters from his comedy shorts for the canceled anthology series The Cartoonstitute. He developed Regular Show from his own experiences in college. Simultaneously, several of the show's main characters originated from his animated shorts The Naïve Man from Lolliland and 2 in the AM PM. Following its fifth season's success, Regular Show was renewed for a sixth season on October 29, 2013. The season premiered on October 9, 2014 and concluded on June 25, 2015, and was produced by Cartoon Network Studios.

Regular Shows sixth season was storyboarded and written by Calvin Wong, Ryan Pequin, Benton Connor, Sarah Oleksyk, Madeline Queripel, Minty Lewis, Toby Jones, Owen Dennis, and Casey Crowe. For this season, the writers were J. G. Quintel, Mike Roth, John Infantino, Sean Szeles, Michele Cavin, and Matt Price, who is also the story editor.

Development

Concept
Two 23-year-old friends, a blue jay named Mordecai and a raccoon named Rigby, are employed as groundskeepers at a park and spend their days trying to slack off and entertain themselves by any means. This is much to the chagrin of their boss Benson and their coworker Skips, but the delight of Pops. Their other coworkers, Muscle Man (an overweight green man) and Hi-Five Ghost (a ghost with a hand extending from the top of his head) serve as their rivals.

Production
Many of the characters are loosely based on those developed for Quintel's student films at California Institute of the Arts: The Naive Man From Lolliland and 2 in the AM PM. Quintel pitched Regular Show for Cartoon Network's Cartoonstitute project, in which the network allowed artists to create pilots with no notes to be optioned as a show possibly. After being green-lit, Quintel recruited several indie comic book artists to compose the show's staff, as their style matched close to what he desired for the series. The season was storyboarded and written by Calvin Wong, Ryan Pequin, Benton Connor, Sarah Oleksyk, Madeline Queripel, Minty Lewis, Toby Jones, Owen Dennis, and Casey Crowe. For this season, the writers were J. G. Quintel, Mike Roth, John Infantino, Sean Szeles, Michele Cavin, and Matt Price, who is also the story editor, while being produced by Cartoon Network  Studios. This was the last season Roth was involved in, before he left to work with the Cartoon Network Studios shorts program; in which Szeles took his place as sole supervising producer.

The sixth season of Regular Show was produced between September 2013 and August
2014.  It utilizes double entendres and mild language; Quintel stated that, although the network wanted to step up from the more child-oriented fare, some restrictions came with this switch.

Episodes

References

2014 American television seasons
2015 American television seasons
Regular Show seasons